Grishinskaya is a rural locality (a village) in Mityukovskoye Rural Settlement, Vozhegodsky District, Vologda Oblast, Russia. The population was 59 as of 2002.

Geography 
Sosnovitsa is the nearest rural locality.

References 

Rural localities in Vozhegodsky District